Gadget & the Gadgetinis is an animated television series and the sequel of the 1983 series Inspector Gadget. The series was a co-production between Fox Kids Europe, DIC Entertainment Corporation, French animation studio SIP Animation, French broadcaster M6 Métropole Télévision, the British Channel 5 and the Italian Mediatrade S.P.A. The show was first screened at MIPTV 2002.

Gadget & the Gadgetinis is currently a property of WildBrain, which holds the rights to most of DIC's library.

Plot
Having been recruited by an elite international peacekeeping group called the World Organization of Mega Powers (or WOMP for short), Lieutenant Gadget (promoted from his previous position of Inspector), now fights crime with a pair of mechanical assistants called the Gadgetinis, small robot versions of Gadget who were created by Penny (due to Brain retiring from active duty) and who are the unintended victims of Gadget's bumbling.

As a member of WOMP, Lieutenant Gadget and his Gadgetinis still have to tangle with Doctor Claw and his organization M.A.D.

Characters

 Augustin Tamare/Lieutenant Gadget (voiced by Maurice LaMarche) – Now working for WOMP as a Lieutenant, Gadget is still the same cyborg he was in the 1983 series, except he has been upgraded with several new gadgets. He is usually blind to MAD's interference in missions or their presence, sometimes making it easier for them to continue with Dr. Claw's evil plans, but they are nearly always thwarted, usually by accident. Gadget's appearance is somewhat different from his original design, as his hat and coat are now dark grey, his gloves are yellow, his tie and pants are a brighter blue and looks a lot younger. He also wears green sunglasses in most episodes.
 The Gadgetinis (voiced by Maurice LaMarche) – Fidget (orange) and Digit (blue) are two small robots created by Penny who are miniature versions of Gadget. They frequently aid Gadget on his missions and each one has their own arsenal of hidden gadgets and devices, including video communicators in their chest-pieces. Penny created them after Brain retired due to a nervous breakdown. Fidget is the most easily spooked of the pair. He does things robots cannot do, such as feeling pain or sneeze, which Digit usually questions. Digit is the smarter, sarcastic, and more literal of the Gadgetinis. He often reminds Fidget that he is a robot when Fidget does something that robots can't do.
 Penny (voiced by Tegan Moss) – Gadget's know-it-all 12-year-old niece is the creator of the Gadgetinis. Instead of secretly following Gadget, she contacts the Gadgetinis to offer advice and information from home. She usually does this from the attic, using her laptop computer and many other hi-tech tools, which replace her computer book and video watch. She also usually corrects Fidget about being a robot when he does something robots can't do, is less patient than she was in the original series, and has a bit of a short temper. Penny wears her hair in pigtails as she did in the original 1983 series.

WOMP
 General Sir (voiced by Alvin Sanders) – The leader of WOMP, the General assigns missions to Gadget. He is completely oblivious to Gadget's incompetence and antics. General Sir favors Gadget over Nozzaire because he's kinder than Nozzaire.
 Ms. Miffet – Secretary of General Sir.
 Colonel Nozzaire (voiced by Colin Murdock) – Colonel Nozzaire is a former member of the French Foreign Legion and Gadget's new superior. Nozzaire hates Gadget and barely tolerates him, because he is extremely stupid, repeatedly hurts him and/or wrecks his office. Nozzaire constantly tries to partake in missions himself, only to get captured by M.A.D. or become badly injured as a result of Gadget's interference or incompetence.

M.A.D.
 Doctor Claw (voiced by Brian Drummond) – Unlike the original series, viewers can actually see his legs and torso from time to time, his gauntlets are now gold with black joints and knuckles, and with the M.A.D. logo printed on them. Most of the time instead of banging his hand on his desk and hitting his cat, he scratches the arm of his chair when angered. In addition, he also has a brother named Doctor Thaw and a nephew named William who is Doctor Thaw's son.
 MAD Cat (vocal effects provided by Ellen Kennedy) – Doctor Claw's pet cat who now has a chair of his own.
 Maryland Claw (voiced by Teryl Rothery) – Doctor Claw and Doctor Thaw's mother and William's grandmother. She first met Claw's father in jail, the same day Gadget's parents met. Maryland has higher authority over her son even going as far as to stop him in his evil deeds. Doctor Claw once had his M.A.D. agents turned invisible so that they could try to rob her house, apparently to get some childhood trophies from her. Like her son, only Maryland's right hand is seen. Though in the episode "Erasing Gadget," her face does appear when Gadget travels back in time.

Other characters
 Brain (vocal effects provided by Lee Tockar) – After years of Gadget repeatedly mistaking him for M.A.D. Agents and trying to apprehend him, Brain is now phobic and nervous when he hears Gadget's name and has taken refuge in a shack by a lake.
 Chief Quimby – Now he's an agent of WOMP working as General Sir's top informant of the Cryptic Intelligence Agency (a parody of the real-life Central Intelligence Agency, or CIA). He uses self-destructing messages, much like the previous series.
 Jools & Annie Tamare – Gadget's parents and Penny's grandparents who first met each other by crashing their bicycles.
 Jeanette Sir – The General's daughter whom the lieutenant fell in love with.

Episodes

Production
The original creators of Inspector Gadget reunited for this series. Andy Heyward initiated the concept and was one of the executive producers; Jean Chalopin created/developed the show and wrote or co-wrote every episode; while Bruno Bianchi designed the main characters as well as directing and producing the series. Gadget & the Gadgetinis follows basically the same plot as the original series, with the clueless Gadget attempting to fight crime while Penny and her helpers do all the work and he takes full credit for it, when he had no idea what happened. Dr. Claw appears less frequently and there are new villains for the group to contend with. Each episode would be budgeted at approximately $400,000 per episode. Saban was originally intended to distribute internationally Gadget & the Gadgetinis. There were also going to be more Gadgetinis as the show would progress.

While Brain and Chief Quimby are mainly absent from the show, they do appear in pictures in Gadget's house. Each also appears as a special guest in one episode. Brain appears in episode 36, No Brainer, which reveals that, having been traumatized after years of pain while saving Gadget and Gadget mistaking him for M.A.D. Agents, he retired from crime-fighting to live in a riverside house, which only Penny knows about. The mere mention of the word "gadget" is enough to drive him frantic. Brain is also mentioned in the episode, Roverre. Chief Quimby appears in episode 45, Super Boss Gadget. They both appear on television in the episode, Too Many Gadgets.

The French end credits to the series show a series of sketches of Penny going to visit Brain at his riverside home. The pair enjoy an emotional reunion.

Maurice LaMarche continued as Gadget's voice, reprising his role from the Sunday Movie Toon, "Inspector Gadget's Last Case", as did Brian Drummond (Dr. Claw) and Tegan Moss (Penny).

Jean-Michel Guirao composed the musical underscore, and the main title song for the English-speaking version was written and performed by Mike Piccirillo. However, the European and French theme songs for "Gadgetinis" were explicitly different: The French version's theme, composed by Noam Kaniel and David Vadant, sounded very close to Shuki Levy and Haim Saban's original Inspector Gadget theme, and was in fact based on the original series' theme song. (The French end credits for the show state: "Musique des génériques: Noam Kaniel, David Vadant, K.I.A. productions. D'après le "Thème de l'Inspecteur Gadget". Musique originale de Haim Saban et Shuki Levy.") The reason this was possible - even though DiC Entertainment (which owned Inspector Gadget) no longer had the rights to Levy and Saban's theme music - is probably that Gadget & the Gadgetinis was produced primarily by the French animation studio SIP Animation, which at the time of production was owned by Haim Saban.

Broadcast 
The show was broadcast across various European countries on Fox Kids starting in late 2002, and remained on some stations after the Jetix rebranding.
In the United Kingdom, the show aired on Channel 5, who were one of the co-producers. They first aired the show in August 2002, a month before it aired in France on M6.
In the United States, the show was planned to air on Fox Family; but since Fox Family Worldwide was purchased by Disney, it never did.
In countries where the channel operated from, it also re-ran on Jetix Play.
The show was airing in Canada on Family Channel.

Merchandise
An event was held at Quick restaurants in France in April 2003.

Video game
A video game based on the series, titled Gadget & the Gadgetinis, was released for the PlayStation 2 and PC in November 2004, developed by Eko Software and published by Hip Games, who had acquired the Inspector Gadget video game license after acquiring Light & Shadow Production in February of that year. It was first unveiled at E3 2004, following an announcement on May 5, 2004, only released in PAL regions, much like with Mad Robots Invasion.

The game's gameplay was mostly criticized for its unoriginality, as well as the character designs and the music. The controls and the game's appeal to children received praise.

References

External links
 

Inspector Gadget
2000s American animated television series
2002 American television series debuts
2003 American television series endings
2000s French animated television series
2002 French television series debuts
2003 French television series endings
American children's animated comic science fiction television series
American animated television spin-offs
English-language television shows
French children's animated comic science fiction television series
French animated television spin-offs
French-language television shows
Television series by DIC Entertainment
Cyborgs in television
Television series created by Jean Chalopin
Television series by Saban Entertainment